Gerard Cousins is a Welsh guitarist, composer and arranger.

Biography

Gerard Cousins was born in Brecon and studied music at the University of Leeds and ARTEZ Conservatorium (Netherlands) where his principal composition teachers were Philip Wilby and David Rowland. He studied the guitar with Jeremy Herbert, Graham Wade and Louis Ignatius Gall.

Following the tradition of the performer/composer, Gerard Cousins has recorded and performed much of his own music. 
He has expanded the guitar repertoire with his own arrangements of traditional Welsh music and often works with contemporary composers arranging and recording their music for guitar. Most notably with Philip Glass and Eric Whitacre.

Radio France dedicated a show to Cousins' recordings of minimalist guitar music featuring his Philip Glass recordings and his own compositions.

Adam Walton dedicated an hour long show on BBC Wales to Cousins' music in 2015.

Discography

Escape - Philip Glass 

Track list:

Opening - Philip Glass*
Metamorphosis 1	- Philip Glass*
Escape - Philip Glass*
Metamorphosis 3	- Philip Glass*
Metamorphosis 5	- Philip Glass*
Knee Play Two - Philip Glass*
Truman Sleeps - Philip Glass*

Arranged for the guitar by Gerard Cousins

Lullabies - The Music of Eric Whitacre 

Track list:

Goodnight Moon - Eric Whitacre*
Sing Gently - Eric Whitacre*
The Seal Lullaby - Eric Whitacre*
This Marriage - Eric Whitacre*

Arranged for the guitar by Gerard Cousins

Una Leyenda 

Track list:

Sonatina - Federico Moreno Torroba
Una Leyenda - Pedro Sanjuan
Tiento Antiguo - Joaquin Rodrigo
Capricho Arabe - Francisco Tarrega
Un Tiempo fue Italica Famosa - Joaquin Rodrigo
El testament d'Amelia - Miguel Llobet
Canco de Lladre - Miguel Llobet
El noi de la Mare - Miguel Llobet
Sonata - Antonio Jose
Romance de los Pinos - Federico Moreno Torroba

A Gift 

Track list:

Wind Color Vector - Takashi Yoshimatsu
Canticle (from Around the Round Ground)  - Takashi Yoshimatsu
Elystan - Gerard Cousins
Viaje a la Semilla - Leo Brouwer
July 18 - Gerard Cousins
A Gift - Robert Jacob
Chant - John Tavener
Hika in Memorium Toru Takemitsu - Leo Brouwer
Tune for Toru - Mark-Anthony Turnage arr. Gerard Cousins

Hiraeth - Celtic Guitar Music from Wales 

Track list:

Tros y Garreg (Crossing the Stone) - Trad.* 
Gwahoddiad (Arglwydd Dyma Fi) - Trad.*
Fantasia on Ar Lan Y Mor - Trad.*
Dafydd y Garreg Wen (David of the White Rock) - Trad.* 
Hiraeth - Grace Williams* (1906-1977) 
Amanda's Delight (from 2 pieces for guitar) - Robert Smith 
A Short Verse for Edward Thornburgh - Thomas Tomkins* (1572- 1656)
A Sad Pavan Forbidding Mourning - Hilary Tann (b. 1947)
Olwyn Ddwr (Water Wheel) - Gareth Glyn* (b. 1951) 
Crossing Water Alone - Simon Thorne* (b. 1954) 
Teifi's Dream (Hen Wlad Fy Nhadau) - Trad.*

Arranged for the guitar by Gerard Cousins

The First Beat is the Last Sound 

Track list:

Assyrian Game - Gerard Cousins
Ripening Prelude  - Gerard Cousins
Lisa Lan - Gerard Cousins
Suo Gan (Variations and Toccata on a Welsh Lullaby) - Gerard Cousins
In the Grip part 1 (homage to Philip Glass) - Gerard Cousins
White Cloud Blue Sky (homage to John McLaughlin) - Gerard Cousins
Cantus Tintinnabulous (homage to Arvo Part) - Gerard Cousins
In the Grip part 2 - Gerard Cousins
The Sound of One Hand Clapping (homage to Steve Reich) - Gerard Cousins
Minimi (for 2 guitars) - Gerard Cousins
This Marriage - Eric Whitacre (arranged by Gerard Cousins)

Podcasts
Gerard Cousins has been interviewed on "The Next Track" and "Guitaronamie" podcasts.

References

External links 
https://www.gerardcousins.com/
https://www.discogs.com/release/17327887-Gerard-Cousins-Philip-Glass-Escape
https://www.prestomusic.com/classical/search?search_query=gerard%20cousins
Gerard Cousins | Biography, Albums, Streaming Links
Interview with Gerard Cousins (October 2016) on #neuguitars #blog

Living people
Welsh guitarists
Welsh composers
Welsh male composers
1974 births
People from Brecon